Nawab Shah is an Indian actor, who works in Hindi, Malayalam, Tamil, Telugu and Kannada-language films and television series. Before entering into films, he played character roles in television serials.

Career
Nawab Shah debuted his acting carrier in 1993 Doordarshan Serial, "Akbar The Great" as Babar. Later he acted in popular serials like "Shaktimaan" on DD National in 1997 and "Indian" on SAB TV in 1999.

In 2000 Shah worked with director Rajeev Kumar in Raja Ko Rani Se Pyar Ho Gaya. The film had Arvind Swamy and Manisha Koirala in the leads. Shah's performance went unnoticed.

His next film Be-Lagaam failed at the box office. Ujjal Chattopadhyay's Escape from Taliban was the first film which had given Shah a chance to "prove his talent". The story was more focused on Manisha Koirala, but Shah's performance was praised. It was a box office failure.

Parwana, Woh, and Dukaan met with the same fate. Shah's wait for recognition was prolonged. His performances in Farhan Akhtar's Lakshya and Saurabh Shukla's Chehraa fetched some praise, but he was not getting pivotal roles.

In 2011, Nawab Shah was signed to play a villain in Salman Khan's Bodyguard. He, however, had an accident and was unable to continue with the film. Later that year, he played another negative role as Jabbar, in Don 2, which starred Shah Rukh Khan in the lead. His performance was praised, and the film became a high commercial success. Shah later appeared in Bhaag Milkha Bhaag as a Pakistani athletics coach. He recently played a role in Dilwale, as Raghav, one of Dev Malik's henchmen.

Personal life
Shah and actress Pooja Batra revealed their relationship in June 2019. They dated for few years before marrying because Shah met resistance from his family, his mother in particular preferring that he'd marry a fellow Muslim. They eventually got married on 4 July 2019 in Delhi according to Arya Samaj traditions. Nawab Shah was married prior as well and was a divorcee.

Filmography

Film
Hindi

Kartoos (1999)
Pyaar Koi Khel Nahin (1999)
Raja Ko Rani Se Pyar Ho Gaya (2000)
Ittefaq (2001)
Escape From Taliban (2003)
Musafir (2004)
Lakshya (2004)
Jaan-E-Mann (2006) 
Luck (2009)
Don 2 (2011) as Abdul Jabbar 
Bhaag Milkha Bhaag (2013)
Humshakals (2014)
Dilwale (2015) 
Tiger Zinda Hai (2017) as Pawan
Panipat (2019) as Ibrahim Khan Gardi
Dabangg 3 (2019) as Gullu
 Khuda Haafiz (2020)

Tamil

Gajendra (2004)
Bose (2004)
Aran (2006)
Yaan (2014)
Seema Raja (2018)
Darbar (2020)
Sulthan (2021)

Telugu

Devi Putrudu (2001)
Dictator (2016)
Godfather (2022)

Malayalam

Keerthi Chakra (2006) as Main Antagonist 
Inspector Garud (2007) as Guptaji (Antagonist) 
Kaaki' (2007) as Parthipan (Main Antagonist) Roudram (2008) as Michael KordaBlack Dalia (2009) as RobertWinter (2009) as RipperKandahar (2010) as Army Cadet's InstructorRajadhi Raja (2014) as Gangster Sathya

KannadaJyeshta (2004)Kotigobba 3 (2021)KabzaaTelevisionAkbar The Great  (DD TV Series) as Mugal Emperor, Babar (Father of Humayun)Shaktimaan  (1997-2005) as Mayor JJ (Jai Kumar Janardhan)/KakodarIndian (2000-2001) as Indian
Ssshhhh...Koi Hai (2001-2003) as Dhrokaal1857 Kranti (2002-2003) as Robert Clive (Episodes 2 to 4)Saarrthi (2004-2008) as Mansen GoenkaAmma (2016) as HaiderNaagarjuna – Ek Yoddha (2016-2017) as S. P. Baldev SinghSacred Games'' (2018) as Salim Kaka
Karma serial

References

External links
 
 

Living people
Indian Muslims
Indian male film actors
Indian male television actors
Male actors from Mumbai
Year of birth missing (living people)